Nebraska Highway 79 is a highway in eastern Nebraska. The southern terminus of Highway 79 is northwest of Lincoln near Lincoln Airport at U.S. Highway 34. The northern terminus of Highway 79 is in Snyder.

Route description
Nebraska Highway 79 begins northwest of Lincoln near Lincoln Municipal Airport at U.S. 34.  The highway goes north into farmland, then northwest and meets Nebraska Highway 66 in Valparaiso.  It goes north until meeting Nebraska Highway 92, with which it runs east concurrently for one mile (1.6 km).  It turns north and passes through Prague.  It continues north, turns east briefly, then turns north to enter Morse Bluff.  It then crosses the Platte River and enters North Bend, where it intersects U.S. Highway 30.  It continues north from North Bend, then ends at Nebraska Highway 91 in Snyder.

Major intersections

References

External links

Nebraska Roads: NE 61-80

079
Transportation in Lancaster County, Nebraska
Transportation in Saunders County, Nebraska
Transportation in Dodge County, Nebraska